Peel Region may refer to:

 Peel (Western Australia), a region south of Perth, Western Australia
 Regional Municipality of Peel, a region in Southern Ontario, Canada

See also
 Peel (disambiguation)